East Hills may refer to:

Australia
East Hills, New South Wales, a suburb of Sydney
Electoral district of East Hills, the corresponding seat in the New South Wales Legislative Assembly
East Hills Boys High School
East Hills Girls High School
East Hills Hostel
East Hills railway station on the East Hills railway line

United States
East Hills, New York, a village in Nassau County
East Hills (Pittsburgh), Pennsylvania, the easternmost neighborhood in the city of Pittsburgh
East Hills Mall, a shopping mall in St. Joseph, Missouri

See also
East Hill (disambiguation)